BBC Midlands may refer to:

BBC East Midlands, the BBC English Region covering Derbyshire, Leicestershire, Nottinghamshire and Rutland, headquartered in Nottingham
BBC West Midlands, the BBC English Region covering the West Midlands metropolitan county, Warwickshire, Worcestershire, Herefordshire, Shropshire, Staffordshire and parts of Northern Gloucestershire, and headquartered in Birmingham